Opel Manufacturing Poland Sp. z o.o. (formerly General Motors Manufacturing Poland Sp. z o.o.) is an automobile manufacturer in Poland. It assembles light commercial vehicles in a factory in Gliwice and builds engines in Tychy. Opel Manufacturing Poland is a subsidiary of Opel Automobile GmbH in Rüsselsheim, Germany which in turn is a subsidiary of Stellantis.

This is not to be confused with the Opel sales company Opel Poland Sp. z o.o. with seat in Warszawa, appearing publicly as Opel Polska.

Car assembly in Gliwice

Passenger cars
The factory in Gliwice built the compact Opel Astra car for the Opel, Vauxhall and Holden brands and the Opel Cascada for the formerly named brands and as Buick for the North American market.

The passenger car assembly ended on the 30 November 2021.

Light commercial vehicles
As the production of Opel Astra in Gliwice was reported to end on the 30 November 2021, Stellantis also announced to start the production of light commercial vehicles (Opel Movano, Peugeot Boxer, Fiat Ducato and Citroën Jumper) in April 2022 in the new factory next to the old one.

Engine factory in Tychy

Formerly GM Powertrain Poland and before that Isuzu Motors Polska Sp. z o.o. or ISPOL was opened in 1996 by Isuzu as a production site for the Circle L engine. However, Isuzu's financial troubles caused General Motors to take control with 60% of ISPOL's capital in 2002. Since then the plant manufactured over two million engines for Opel/Vauxhall. The engines are for various Opel/Vauxhall models.

In 2013, General Motors Company purchased the remaining 40% shares of the Tychy plant from Isuzu Motors Ltd.

In preparation for the sale by GM of the brands Opel and Vauxhall with the whole of the Opel/Vauxhall automobile business in Europe per August 1, 2017, this factory was transferred in the property of Opel Automobile GmbH, which was sold to PSA.

On March 21, 2018 PSA announced that this factory would be retooled to produce 3-cylinder "Puretech" petrol engines to be delivered to PSA's factory in Trnava, Slovakia, saving hundreds of kilometers in transport, and avoiding to build an engine factory at the Trnava site.

Products

Current models 
Fiat Ducato (2022−present)
Peugeot Boxer (2022−present)
Citroën Jumper (2022−present)
Opel Movano C (2022−present)

Past models 
Opel Astra F Classic (1998−2002)
Opel Agila A (2000−2007)
Opel Astra G Classic (2003−2009)
Suzuki Wagon R+ (2005−2007)
Opel Zafira B (2005−2010)
Opel Astra H Classic (2006−2014)
Opel Astra J hatchback (2009−2015)
Opel Astra GTC (2011−2018)
Opel Astra J sedan (2012−2020)
Opel Cascada (2013−2019)
Opel Astra K hatchback (2015−2021)

See also 
 Stellantis
 Opel

regarding Tychy engine factory 
General Motors
GM Powertrain Torino
Fiat Powertrain Technologies
Ecotec
List of GM engines
Multijet

References

External links
 Tychy Plant. Facts and Figures

Gliwice
Tychy
Opel factories
Motor vehicle assembly plants in Poland